On 2 February 2016, the dead body of a teenage girl was found at Nayagaun of Pokhara-15, Nepal. The body was later identified as Yoruna Pun aka Neha. Police already found the murderer named as Kirtan Khadgi, 21, alias Satish who was close friend of Neha Pun.

References

2015 crimes in Nepal
Violence against women in Nepal
Murder in Nepal
P
2010s murders in Nepal